The 2014 ASB Classic was a women's tennis tournament played on outdoor hard courts. It was the 29th edition of the ASB Classic, and was part of the WTA International tournaments category of the 2014 WTA Tour. It took place at the ASB Tennis Centre in Auckland, New Zealand, on 30 December 2013 to 4 January 2014.

Points and prize money

Point distribution

Prize money 

1 Qualifiers' prize money is also the Round of 32 prize money
* per team

Singles entrants

Seeds 

1 Rankings as of 30 December 2013

Other entrants 
The following players received wildcards into the singles main draw: 
  Andrea Hlaváčková
  Ana Konjuh
  Tamira Paszek

The following players received entry from the qualifying draw:
  Sharon Fichman
  Sachie Ishizu
  Anett Kontaveit
  Kristýna Plíšková

Withdrawals 
Before the tournament
  Iveta Melzer → replaced by  Lauren Davis
  Laura Robson (wrist injury) → replaced by  Johanna Larsson
  Elena Vesnina (ankle injury) → replaced by  Julia Görges

During the tournament
  Jamie Hampton (hip injury)

Retirements 
  Alexandra Cadanțu (right shoulder injury)

Doubles entrants

Seeds 

1 Rankings as of 23 December 2013

Other entrants 
The following pairs received wildcards into the doubles main draw:
  Kirsten Flipkens /  Ana Ivanovic
  Abigail Guthrie /  Sacha Jones

Champions

Singles 

  Ana Ivanovic defeated  Venus Williams 6–2, 5–7, 6–4

Doubles 

  Sharon Fichman /  Maria Sanchez defeated  Lucie Hradecká /  Michaëlla Krajicek 2–6, 6–0, [10–4]

See also
 2014 Heineken Open – men's tournament

References

External links 
 Official website

2014 WTA Tour
2014
ASB
ASB
ASB
2014 in New Zealand tennis